Oleg Mutu (born 22 July 1972) is a Romanian cinematographer and film producer. He was born in Chișinău, then part of the Moldavian Soviet Socialist Republic.

With director Cristian Mungiu, Mutu developed a formula of lengthy takes and medium shots with the director's first feature film, Occident (2002). Mutu later produced and directed photography for Mungiu's 2007 Palme d'Or-winning film 4 Months, 3 Weeks and 2 Days. Mutu opted for a minimalist approach, lighting the backgrounds while attempting not to distract from the characters too much. Mutu also set up lights from building roofs for the final scenes, employing a rod and paper lanterns for the camera. For the film, he shared the European Film Award for Best Film, the first time a Romanian work won the honour. At Romania's national Gopo Awards, he shared the award for Best Feature Film and won Best Cinematography.

Filmography
His films include:

References

External links
Oleg Muto at the Internet Movie Database

1972 births
Living people
Moldovan emigrants to Romania
Film people from Chișinău
Romanian cinematographers
Romanian film producers